Richneck Plantation was located on the Virginia Peninsula on the northern shore of the James River between Hampton Roads and Jamestown in the English colony of Virginia.

The proprietor of Richneck Plantation was Robert Rich, second Earl of Warwick and a prominent member of the Virginia Company. The Warwick River, Warwick River Shire, and Warwick County were all named for him. Nearby, Warwick Towne was the first county seat.

In modern times, the former site of Richneck Plantation is located in the modern day independent city of Newport News, Virginia, where Richneck Road remains as a locally used name in the Denbigh area.

See also 
James River Plantations
Newport News, Virginia
List of former United States counties
Warwick County, Virginia

References

James River plantations
History of Newport News, Virginia
Houses in Virginia